Natoma Presbyterian Church is a church at 408 N. 3rd Street in Natoma, Kansas.  It was built in 1899 and added to the National Register of Historic Places in 2006.

It is a one-story wood-frame gable-front church.  It has an octagonal steeple.  Several elements of its design, including pointed tops of windows, are Gothic Revival in style.

References

Presbyterian churches in Kansas
Churches on the National Register of Historic Places in Kansas
Neoclassical architecture in Kansas
Churches completed in 1899
Buildings and structures in Osborne County, Kansas
1899 establishments in Kansas
National Register of Historic Places in Osborne County, Kansas
19th-century Presbyterian church buildings in the United States
Neoclassical church buildings in the United States